Peter Nilson (17 October 1937 – 8 March 1998) was a Swedish astronomer and novelist.  Active at Uppsala University, he compiled a catalogue of galaxies containing nearly 13,000 entries. He was appreciated for a number of essay books (primarily about science) and for a number of science fiction novels like Rymdväktaren, or "The Space Guardian" and Nyaga.

He was born in the Smålandian village of Näsby and under the early teens a farmer, but science, with its celebrities such as Charles Darwin and Albert Einstein made such an impression on him, as to motivate him to accomplish college studies by letter correspondence. In the early 1960s he began his studies in Uppsala University, initially in mathematics, and thereafter theoretical physics, aesthetics, history of ideas and astronomy.

He was elected a member of the Royal Swedish Academy of Sciences in 1993.

Works
Lysande stjärnor (1970)
Uppsala General Catalogue of Galaxies (1973)
Upptäckten av universum (1975)
Himlavalvets sällsamheter (1977)
Trollkarlen (1979)
Främmande världar (1980)
Arken (1982)
Mitt i labyrinten (1983)
Guldspiken (1985)
Avgrundsbok (1987)
Äventyret (1989)
Messias med träbenet (1990)
Stjärnvägar (1991)
Rymdljus (1992)
Solvindar (1993)
Hem till jorden (1994)
Rymdväktaren (1995)
Nyaga (1996)
Den gamla byn (1997). Illustrated by Björn Gidstam
Ljuden från kosmos (2000, posthum)

References

1937 births
1998 deaths
Swedish-language writers
20th-century Swedish astronomers
Uppsala University alumni
Members of the Royal Swedish Academy of Sciences